Lydell Ross (born October 29, 1983) is a former American football running back for the Buckeyes. During his sophomore  year at Ohio State University in 2002, he was a supporting member of the Ohio State Buckeyes national championship team.

Career rushing statistics at Ohio State

References

External links 

1983 births
Living people
American football running backs
Ohio State Buckeyes football players